Lycopersene is a carotenoid found in Corynebacterium, Lemna minor, and Zea mays. It has the chemical formula of C40H66. It has antioxidant, antimutagenic, antiproliferative, cytotoxicity, antibacterial and pesticide effects.

References 

Organic pigments